Summerhill House was a 100-roomed mansion  in County Meath, Ireland which was the ancestral seat of the Viscounts Langford and the Barons Langford. Built in 1731, Summerhill House demonstrated the power and wealth the Langford Rowley family had at the time. They owned vast amounts of land in counties Meath, Westmeath, Cork, Londonderry, Antrim, and Dublin as well as in Devon and Cornwall in the England.

Summerhill House dominated the landscape and was exceptionally imposing as it was situated on the summit of a hill. The main entrance was from the village of Summerhill.  The other entrance was from the Dublin road, with the avenue 1 mile long. Like all such demesnes, there were four avenues leading out to the four points of the compass.

The mansion at Summerhill was designed by Sir Edward Lovett Pearce and completed by Richard Cassels in the Palladian style, although Sir John Vanbrugh (who was related to Pearce) had a great influence on the house, which could be seen by the great arched chimney stacks, Pearce actually had trained in Vanburgh's office. Robert Adam, also redecorated a small amount of the rooms later on in the mansion's history.

The mansion at Summerhill welcomed royalty, it was an exceptionally dignified house and at its time of erection ranked architecturally amongst the finest and grandest mansions in Europe.

History

Rowley Langford family 
John Rowley came to Ireland during the reign of James I, as sole agent for the building of the towns of Derry and Coleraine for the London Society. Upon the incorporation of the city of Derry in 1613, he was, by charter, appointed first Mayor. One of his daughters, Anne, married Tristram Beresford, ancestor to the family of Tyrone. Another daughter, Mary, married James Clotworthy, and by him had an only daughter, who married the Honourable Robert Fitzgerald, and who was grandmother of Lieutenant-General The 1st Duke of Leinster.

John Rowley was knighted for his services at the time of the Restoration. He only left one son, Hercules, whose only son and heir, Hercules Langford Rowley, married in 1732, Elizabeth Ormsby (later created The 1st Viscountess Langford). Around this time he built a magnificent Georgian mansion at Summerhill.

Empress Elisabeth of Austria 

The Empress of Austria visited Summerhill in February 1879. The preparations were a well kept secret, the first thing that had to be sorted is where would she stay. Meath hunted the best hounds and Summerhill was centrally located so Summerhill was picked. When she was on one hunt in Dunshaughlin, as they came to Maynooth they came across two men repairing a demesne wall of the Catholic seminary. As the deer they were hunting jumped into the land of the college, the empress followed without knowing where she was going and nearly jumped on the President of the college, Professor William Walsh, who later became the Archbishop of Dublin and Primate of Ireland.

On 13 November 2010 one famous riding whip appeared in a country house auction in Slane Castle held by Adams. This whip was owned by the Empress and was given to Robert Fowler who was the Master of the Meath Hounds at the time of her stay in Summerhill. The whip had been lost and had been found not long before the auction in Rahinston House. The whip was found in a mahogany presentation case with a silver crest plate bearing the Imperial Arms of Habsburg. The whip was estimated at €3,000-€5,000 but reached a total of €37,000.

Demise 
Summerhill House was damaged by fire on a number of occasions and suffered problems when farm hands went on strike and damaged farming equipment in 1919. Republican workers and farm hands were evicted from their homes and after months of agrarian agitation eventually on 4 February 1921, the Irish Republican Army invaded and took the estate and distributed the lands and farms around the house equally amongst the workers and their families, before they set the house on fire where it was completely destroyed.

The house and estate had been inherited in 1854 by The 4th Baron Langford (1848-1919). He was succeeded by his son, the young 5th Baron (1894-1922), who died prematurely and was in turn succeeded by his elderly cousin, Colonel William Chambre Rowley, who became the 6th Baron.

In 1922,  Colonel The 6th Baron Langford (1849-1931), who had only inherited the barony the previous year, sought compensation from the Government of the Irish Free State. After three years of negotiation with the Compensation Board, a sum of £43,500 was paid to Colonel Lord Langford, approximately one third of the value of the house and contents destroyed in the fire. The elderly Lord Langford invested the money in gilt-edged stocks and moved to Middlesex in England.

Summerhill House stood as a ruin until it was totally demolished in 1970. Summerhill House was listed in "Forgotten Houses of Ireland", as the most beautiful house in Ireland.

Description

The mansion at Summerhill was magnificently placed on top of a hill. It consisted of a centre block and two wings, the mansion was massively built of limestone and of great length. Four semi-columns with Corinthian capitals ornamented the front; the main order was carried up the full height of the house like Renaissance Palaces in Rome. There was a portico in front of two sunken gardens behind with a raised grassy platform for a sundial; a large rose garden as well as another very large garden. When the Langford mansion was built the path went up the hill and around the portico.

A broad flight of stairs led to the entrance of the mansion. There was a large and very lofty hall, which was similar to Leinster House in Dublin. The hall contained plaques and oil portraits. To the right on entering was the library. The drawing room had a southern aspect, and contained several portraits of the Rowley family. The state dining room was detached from the main block and had beautifully covered ceilings. The grand stairs led to the bedrooms.

External links

Historical Picture Archive

References

Country houses in Ireland
Manor houses
Houses completed in 1731
Palladian architecture in Ireland
Houses in County Meath
Demolished buildings and structures in the Republic of Ireland
Edward Lovett Pearce buildings
Richard Cassels buildings